I gränslandet is a 2012 Sonja Aldén studio album.

Track listing
Innan jag släcker lampan
Lilla evighet
Närmre
I din himmel
Ljusa ögonblick
En stund om dagen
I kärlekens land
Våga
Ödet i din hand
Ditt sista ord
Kärlekens lov
Ett strävsamt gammalt par

Contributors 
Sonja Aldén - vocals
Henrik Wikström - musician
Amir Aly - musician
Peter Boström - musician

Charts

References 

2012 albums
Sonja Aldén albums
Swedish-language albums